Bernard Charles M. E. T. H. Foccroulle (born 23 November 1953) is a Belgian organist, composer, conductor and opera director.

Biography 
He was born in Liège and studied at the Conservatoire de Liège. Initially, he became known as a member of the Ricercar Consort. He was president of the Jeunesses musicales, and in 1992, he was named director of the Théâtre royal de la Monnaie.

Works 
 Resonance (for pipe and electronic organ), 1976
 Acousmie (for organ and synthesizer), 1980
 Tiento de diversos modes, 1982
 Sinforuen (for organ, bells and percussion), 1984
 Capriccio, 1986

References 

Musicians from Liège
1953 births
Living people
Belgian conductors (music)
Belgian male musicians
Male conductors (music)
Belgian organists
Male organists
Belgian composers
Male composers
Opera managers
Royal Conservatory of Liège alumni
Academic staff of the Royal Conservatory of Brussels
21st-century conductors (music)
21st-century organists
21st-century male musicians